The men's rings competition for gymnastics artistic at the 2019 Southeast Asian Games in Philippines was held from 1 to 3 December 2019 at Rizal Memorial Coliseum.

Schedule
All times are Philippine Standard Time (UTC+8).

Results

Qualification

Final

References

Men's rings